Georgios Karathanasis is a former football player born January 31, 1971, in Norrköping. He played four seasons for IFK Norrköping and had one spell with IF Sylvia. Scored his only goal against AIK 2002.He also played abroad in Greece in the highest division for FC Kalamata and also in his youth played in the national team.

References

 http://www.elitefootball.com/player/georgios-karathanasis/25086

1971 births
Living people
Swedish footballers
Association footballers not categorized by position
Sportspeople from Norrköping
Footballers from Östergötland County